"If—" is a poem by English writer and poet Rudyard Kipling (1865–1936), written circa 1895 as a tribute to Leander Starr Jameson. It is a literary example of Victorian-era stoicism. The poem, first published in Rewards and Fairies (1910) following the story "Brother Square-Toes", is written in the form of paternal advice to the poet's son, John.

Publication
"If—" first appeared in the "Brother Square Toes" chapter of the book Rewards and Fairies, a collection of Kipling's poetry and short-story fiction published in 1910. In his posthumously published autobiography, Something of Myself (1937), Kipling said that, in writing the poem, he was inspired by the character of Leander Starr Jameson, leader of the failed Jameson Raid against the South African Republic to overthrow the Boer government of Paul Kruger. The failure of that mercenary coup d'état aggravated the political tensions between Great Britain and the Boers, which led to the Second Boer War (1899–1902).

Reception
As an evocation of Victorian-era stoicism, the "stiff upper lip" self-discipline that popular culture rendered into a British national virtue and character trait, "If—" remains a cultural touchstone. The British cultural-artifact status of the poem is evidenced by the parodies of the poem, and by its popularity among Britons.

T. S. Eliot included the poem in his 1941 collection A Choice of Kipling's Verse.

In India, a framed copy of the poem was affixed to the wall before the study desk in the cabins of the officer cadets at the National Defence Academy at Pune and the Indian Naval Academy at Ezhimala. In Britain, the first verse is set, in granite setts, into the pavement of the promenade in Westward Ho! in Devon. The third and fourth lines of the second stanza of the poem: "If you can meet with Triumph and Disaster / and treat those two impostors just the same" are written on the wall of the players' entrance to the Centre Court at the All England Lawn Tennis and Croquet Club, where the Wimbledon Championships are held. These same lines appear at the West Side Tennis Club in Forest Hills, New York City, where the US Open was played until 1977.

The Indian writer Khushwant Singh considered the poem "the essence of the message of The Gita in English."

Charles McGrath, a former deputy editor of The New Yorker and a former editor of the New York Times Book Review, wrote that when he was in school, "they had to recite Kipling's 'If—' every day, right after the Pledge of Allegiance: 'If you can fill the unforgiving minute / With sixty seconds' worth of distance run, / Yours is the Earth and everything that's in it, / And—which is more—you'll be a Man, my son!

Pablo Neruda—like Kipling, a Nobel laureate—found a framed ornamental copy of the poem near the Duke of Alba's bedside in the Palacio de Liria. However, his view was not favourable, and he referred to it as "that pedestrian and sanctimonious poetry, precursor of the Reader's Digest, whose intellectual level seems to me no higher than that of the Duke of Alba's boots".

In the BBC's 1996 nationwide poll, "If—" was voted the UK's favourite poem, gaining twice as many votes as the runner-up.

Text

See also
 "Invictus" by William Ernest Henley
 "The Man in the Arena" by Theodore Roosevelt
 "Desiderata" by Max Ehrmann
 "The Gods of the Copybook Headings" by Rudyard Kipling
 "Vitaï Lampada" by Henry Newbolt
 Agency (philosophy)

References

External links

 Reading of "If—" on Wikimedia Commons
 
 Authentic digital editions archive of "If—" 
 Staging of "If—" as a comic strip
 If by Rudyard Kipling on YouTube

1910 poems
Doubleday, Page & Company books
Poetry by Rudyard Kipling
1890s poems
Stoicism
Victorian culture
National symbols of the United Kingdom